Price or Pryce is a patronymic name derived from the Welsh "ap Rhys" meaning "son of Rhys". The given name Rhys means "enthusiasm" in Welsh. It is a common surname among those of Welsh ancestry. At the time of the British Census of 1881, its frequency was highest in Radnorshire (38.2 times the British average), followed by Brecknockshire, Herefordshire, Monmouthshire, Flintshire, Shropshire, Denbighshire, Glamorgan, Carmarthenshire and Worcestershire. The surname has many other spellings including Priess, Priesz, and many others.

The name is thought to have originally been spelled "Pryce" and pronounced "Preese". Name experts believe that the change of the "y" to "i" and the subsequent change in pronunciation was originally an affectation meant to make the name seem more English and therefore more prestigious.

Notable people named Price

 Adam Price (born 1968), Welsh politician
 Alan Price (born 1942), English musician, songwriter and actor
 Alan R. Price (born 1942), American health academic
 Alfred Douglas Price (1860–1921), African American businessperson and community leader
 Allen Price (born 1968), Welsh footballer
 Alex Price (born 1985), British actor
 Anthony Price (1928–2019), English author of espionage thrillers
Austin Price (born 1995), American basketball player in the Israeli Premier Basketball League
Ben Price (born 1972), British actor, director and writer 
 Berwyn Price (1951), former Welsh athlete
 Betty Price (disambiguation), multiple people
 Betsy Price (born 1949), American politician
 Billy Price (actor) (born 2000), English actor
 Billy Price (American football) (born 1995), American football player
 Birgitte Price (1934–1997), Danish actress
 Bobby Price (born 1998), American football player
 Brendan Price, English actor 
 Bruce Price (1845–1903), architect of many of the Canadian Pacific Railway's Château-type stations and hotels
 Bryan Price (born 1962), American baseball coach
 Clayton Sumner Price (1874–1950), western artist
 Carey Price (born 1987), Canadian hockey goaltender playing for the Montreal Canadiens
 Cecil Price (1938–2001), deputy sheriff and conspirator in the murders of Chaney, Goodman, and Schwerner
 Cedric Price (1934–2003), English architect and teacher and writer on architecture
 Charles H. Price II (1931–2012), American businessman and former Ambassador of the United States
 Charles Melvin Price (1905–1988), United States Congressman
 Charlotte Price White (1873 - 1932), Welsh suffragist and politician 
 Christopher Price (disambiguation), various people
 Cicero Price (1805–1888), United States Navy commodore
 Claire Price (born 1972), English actress
 Clinton G. Price (1864–1937), American politician and lawyer
 Craig Price:
 Craig Chandler Price (born 1973), American serial killer
 Craig Price (born 1989), Welsh rugby union player
 Dale Price (1924–1997), Justice of the Arkansas Supreme Court
 Daniel Price (disambiguation) (or Danny Price), multiple people
 David Price (disambiguation), multiple people
 Denham Price (1940–2013), South African cricketer
 Dennis Price (1915–1973), English actor
 Derek J. de Solla Price (1922–1983), science historian and information scientist
 Dick Price (1930–1985), co-founder of Esalen Institute
 Dilys Price (1932–2020), Welsh educator, parachutist, and model
 Dionne Price, African-American statistician
 Dolours Price (1951–2013), Irish Republican
 Dorothy Price (1890–1954), Irish physician
 D'Vonte Price (born 1999), American football player
 Eddie Price Sr. (1925–1979), Tulane University Green Wave and NFL running back
 Eddie Price III (born 1953), Louisiana elected official
 Ed Price (Louisiana politician) (born 1953), member of the Louisiana House of Representatives
 E. Hoffmann Price (1898–1988), writer of popular fiction
 Ejuan Price (born 1993), American football player
 Eli Kirk Price (1797–1884), first commissioner of Fairmount Park
 Eli Kirk Price II (1860–1933), noted Philadelphian
 Elizabeth Price (gymnast) (born 1996), American gymnast and London 2012 Reserve
 Ernest B. Price (1890–1973), American diplomat in China
 Ethel Clay Price (1874–1943), American nurse and socialite
 Eugenia Price (1916–1996), American historical novelist
 Evadne Price (1888–1985), Australian-British freelance journalist, columnist, author, playwright, actor, television presenter, screenwriter, and astrologer
 Florence Price (1887–1953), African-American classical composer
 Four Price, or Walter Thomas Price IV (born 1967), member of the Texas House of Representatives
 Dr. Frederick K.C. Price (1932–2021), American pastor of Crenshaw Christian Center
 Gary Price (disambiguation), multiple people
 George Cadle Price (1919–2011), the first Prime Minister of Belize and the architect of that country's independence
 George Lawrence Price (1892–1918), Canadian soldier who is traditionally recognized as being the last soldier killed during the First World War
 George McCready Price (1870–1963), Canadian creationist
 George Price (New Yorker cartoonist) (1901–1995), United States cartoonist
 George R. Price (1922–1975), American population geneticist
 Gerwyn Price (born 1985), Welsh professional darts player and former professional rugby union and rugby league footballer
 Glenn D. Price (born 1955), Canadian conductor of music
 Grenfell Price (1892–1977), Australian historian and geographer
 Griffith Baley Price (1905–2006), American mathematician
 Gwilym A. Price (1895–1985), American lawyer, banker, and industrialist
 Harry Price (1881–1948), British researcher of psychical phenomena
 Harry Price (Royal Navy) (1877–1965), British sailor and author
 Haydn Price (1883–1964), Welsh international footballer
 Henry Bertram Price (1869–1941), Governor of Guam
 Henry Habberley Price (1899–1984), British philosopher
 Ivan "Hopey" Price (born 2000), British boxer
 Huw Price (born 1953), Australian philosopher
 James Hubert Price (1878–1943), American politician
 Jean Price (1943–2019), American politician
 Jennifer Price, British archaeologist
 Jesse Price (1863–1939), American politician
 Jesse Price (1909–1974), American jazz drummer
 Jessica Price, American writer, editor, designer and producer of video and tabletop games
 Jo Price (born 1985), Welsh rugby union player and former footballer
 Joe Hannah (born 1958), West coast ice cream salesmen 
 John Lloyd Price (1882–1941) Australian politician and son of South Australian Premier
 Joseph Price (disambiguation), multiple people
 Julian Price, American business executive
 Julie Price (bassoonist), English bassoonist
 Katie Price (born 1978), British model and media personality
 Keith Price (born 1991), American football player
 Kenneth Price (1935–2012), American artist
 Kenny Price (1931–1987), American country music singer-songwriter
 Larme Price (born 1972), American serial killer
 Leontyne Price (born 1927), American opera singer
 Lindsay Price (born 1976), American actress
 Lionel Price (1927–2019), British basketball player
 Llewellyn Ivor Price (1905–1980), Brazilian paleontologist
 Lloyd Price (1933–2021), American R&B and rock and roll musician
 Margaret Price (1941–2011), Welsh soprano
 Marian Price (born 1954), Irish Republican
 Maribeth Price (born 1963), American geologist and planetary scientist
 Mark Price, former NBA basketball player
 Martin Price (1939–1995), British numismatist
 Mary Price, American secretary to journalist Walter Lippmann of the New York Herald
 Matthew Price, British journalist
 Mick Price (snooker player) (born 1966), professional snooker player
 Mike Price (born 1946), American football coach
 Nick Price (born 1957), professional golfer
 Niko Price, UFC fighter
 Peerless Price (born 1976), American football wide receiver
 Peter Price (politician) (born 1946), Honorary MEP and member of the European Strategy Council
 Rayford Price (1937-2023), American politician
 Raymond Price (disambiguation), multiple people
 Rebecca Lane Pennypacker Price (1837–1919), American nurse
 Reynolds Price (1933–2011), American man of letters
 Richard H. Price, leading American physicist
 Richard Price (1723–1791), Welsh philosopher
 Richard Price (writer) (born 1949), American novelist and screenwriter
 Rick Price, Australian singer
 Rick Price (bassist), English bassist
 Rick Price (golfer), American professional golfer
 Ritch Price, American college baseball coach
 Robert M. Price (born 1954), American New Testament scholar
 Robert Price (attorney), American attorney, investment banker and corporate executive
 Rodman M. Price (1816–1894), American Democratic Party politician
 Roger Price (Australian politician) (born 1945), Australian politician
 Roger Price (comedy) (1918–1990), American comedy writer best known for his collaborations with Leonard Stern on Mad Libs
 Roger Price (television producer) (born 1941), British television producer
 Ronnie Price, professional basketball player
 Sarah Price (swimmer) (born 1979), former backstroke swimmer from the United Kingdom
 Sarah Price (filmmaker) (born 1970), Welsh director, producer, musician, author, playwright, actor, comedian and screenwriter
 Scott Price, Nebraska state senator
 Sean Price (1972–2015), American rapper, one half of the duo Heltah Skeltah
 Sherwood Price (1928–2020), American film and television actor
 Sol Price (1916–2009), American businessman
 Sophie Price (born 1989), British model
 Sterling Price, Confederate major general during the American Civil War
 Steve Price, Australian rugby league footballer
 T. Douglas Price (born 1945), American archaeologist
 Terry Price (disambiguation), multiple people
 Thomas Price (1852–1909), mason and lay preacher who became the first Labour premier of South Australia
 Thomas Price (Carnhuanawc) (1787–1848), historian and a major Welsh literary figure of the early 19th century
 Thomas Rowe Price, Jr. (1898–1983), American investment banker and proponent of growth investment
 Tom Price (actor), one of the stars of the Five comedy sketch show Swinging
 Tom Price (ice hockey) (born 1954), former ice hockey player
 Tom Price (American politician) (born 1954), American politician
 Tom Pryce (1949–1977), 1970's Formula One Driver
 Vincent Price (1911–1993), American actor
 Walter Thomas Price IV (born 1967), Texas politician
 William A. Price, American journalist who worked as the police reporter for the New York Daily News from 1940 to 1955
 William Evan Price (1827–1880), Quebec businessman and political figure
William H. Price, Co-Founder of Chandler & Price
 William Herbert Price, Attorney General of Ontario from 1926 to 1934 and Treasurer from 1923 to 1926
 William Price (doctor) (1800–1893), physician and eccentric
 William Price (industrialist) (1860–1938), farmer and industrialist
 William Price (Rugby MP) (1934–1999), British Labour politician
 William Price (Royalist colonel) (1619–1691), Royalist colonel in the English Civil War
 William Ray Price Jr., judge on the Supreme Court of Missouri

In fiction
 Fanny Price, protagonist of Mansfield Park by Jane Austen
 Homer Price, a children's book character
 Eglantine Price, a witch in search of the Amulet of Astoroth in the film Bedknobs and Broomsticks
 Captain John Price, fictional leader of the 22nd Special Air Service Regiment in the 2007 video game Call of Duty 4: Modern Warfare
 Chloe Price, a character in the 2015 video game, Life Is Strange, and the protagonist of its 2017 prequel, Life Is Strange: Before the Storm.
Derek, Dilys and Norman Price from Fireman Sam
Tim and Caroline Price, parents of Alex Drake (née Price), a main character of a UK TV-show Life on Mars's sequel Ashes to Ashes.

See also
 Welsh surnames

References

Surnames of Welsh origin
Anglicised Welsh-language surnames
English-language surnames
Patronymic surnames